Labis is town and a mukim (township) in Segamat District in northern Johor, Malaysia. A main trunk road that runs north-south Peninsular Malaysia passes through it, as well as the KTM railway line that connects it with the state's capital in the south, Johor Bahru.

History
Labis started as a small village known as Kampung Paya Merah. The village got its name from a type of river grass which became the favorite food for river terrapins. In early 20th century, British officers came to the villages to survey for new areas to be developed in Segamat district.

The British officers were surprised to see the river terrapins since they had not seen those animals before. They asked the villagers the name of those animals and the  villagers answered, "Labi-labi, tuan," ("River terrapins, sir"). Because they didn't know the name of those animals, the British officers referred to them as labis in the plural form. Therefore, the British officers decided to name the settlement Labis.

Another theory is that in the 17th century, a member of the Malaccan royal family was travelling through the area. He saw something that intrigued him. He called out to his advisors to tell him what it was, he went "Habis? Habis?" thus accidentally blurting out the name Labis.

Malays here planted paddy field and poultry as the main source of food, living in villages such as Kampung Paya Merah, Kampung Tenang and Kampung Sungai Gatom. During the British era, there was a rubber estate known as North Labis Estate was established and the British brought Indian labor as the workforce. During the communist insurgency around 1948, the government brought in Chinese ethnic to the town.

Geography

Labis is situated in the north of Johor, bordering the Segamat sub-district and the state of Pahang to the north, the mukim of Bekok to the east, the mukim of Pogoh to the west and the mukim of Cha’ah to the south.

Labis covers an area of 422 km2, making it the second largest mukim in Johor after Bekok.

Labis town, along with the adjacent commune of Bekok and Cha’ah, are granted autonomy from Segamat and administered by the Labis District Council (Majlis Daerah Labis).

There is a waterfall known as Taka Melor famous among locals situated 15 km from the town near Pekan Air Panas and Kampung Tenang.

Economy
Labis is an agricultural town whose main export is rubber and is one of the main rubber producer in Johor.

Education

Primary schools

Secondary schools

Demographics
As of 2010, Labis has a total population of 36,053 people. It has a large Chinese community.

Transportation

Public transportation

The town is accessible from Labis railway station.

Car
National Highway Federal Route 1.

See also 
 Pekan Air Panas

References

External links
 

Mukims of Segamat District
Towns in Johor